Twin Flames is a Canadian folk rock band and children's music group from Cantley, Quebec led by Sunchild Deer-Okpik (known mononymously as Jaaji) and Chelsey Jodoin (known as Chelsey June).

History

Formation and early years (2015–2018) 
Jaaji (Mohawk and Inuk background) was raised in Quaqtaq, Quebec. Chelsey June (Métis, Algonquin, Cree, and settler heritage) is from Ottawa, Ontario. Jaaji was a police officer for 12 years and Chelsey worked as an Executive Assistant for the Canadian federal government. They were both pursuing solo musical careers when they met in 2014 during the filming of Talent Autochtones Musicaux (TAM), a television series by the Aboriginal Peoples Television Network (APTN). Following this experience they formed the band Twin Flames, releasing their debut album Jaaji and Chelsey June in 2015.

In 2017 Twin Flames released their second album, Signal Fire. Part of this album was financially backed by an online fundraiser in which they raised $1,845 of their $10,000 goal.

Human and Omen (2019–2022) 
In 2019 Twin Flames released the song "Human", UNESCO's official song to celebrate the International Year of Indigenous Languages.

In 2020 Twin Flames released Omen, their first album to receive significant attention in mainstream radio and television. Their songs "Battlefields" and "Grace Too" (a cover of The Tragically Hip's "Grace, Too") have been included in regular rotation on Stingray Radio stations across Canada. In 2021 "Grace Too" was featured in the second season of the CBC Television series TallBoyz. In 2022 "Battlefields" was featured in the Amazon Prime Video TV series The Lake. Following the success of Omen, the band won awards at the Canadian Folk Music Awards, Summer Solstice Indigenous Music Awards, Native American Music Awards, and Capital Music Awards.

Twin Flames Unplugged Live (2023–present) 
In 2023 Twin Flames released Twin Flames Unplugged Live, a collection of 7 re-recorded songs.

Activism

Child and Youth Outreach 
The band's primary focus and source of income is through their educational workshops for children and youth, combining their music with puppets to teach Canadian history from an Indigenous perspective. In response to the COVID-19 pandemic they now provide schools with the option to view their presentations virtually.

The 2020 single "Human" was included in CBC Music's 2019 Canadian Music Class Challenge, a contest for young children to learn and perform Canadian music with their teachers in classrooms.

Chelsey and Jaaji wrote Maakusie Loves Music, a children's book that was released in December 2022.

Addictions and Mental Health Awareness 
Twin Flames attempts to raise awareness of addictions and mental health issues, with Chelsey and Jaaji citing significant personal experience in battling depression and alcoholism and their successful journey to sobriety. An aspiring poet, Chelsey June occasionally shares some of her experiences online through social media in the form of small pieces of writing, using simple language to effectively reach her younger audience. In 2016 the band performed on Alianait's Mental Health Awareness Tour in Nunavut.

Band members 
Current members
Jaaji – lead vocals, guitar (2015–present)
Chelsey June – lead vocals, spirit flute (2015–present)
Jason Watts – drums, background vocals (2019–present)

Former members
Mike Giamberardino – bass, synthesizer, background vocals (2019–2021)
Troy Huizinga – lead guitar, rhythm guitar, keyboard, bass, synthesizer, background vocals (2019–2022)
Scott Norris –  lead guitar, rhythm guitar, synthesizer, background vocals (2021–2022)

Discography
Jaaji and Chelsey June (2015)
Signal Fire (2017)
Omen (2020)
Twin Flames Unplugged Live (2023)

Awards and nominations

|-
|rowspan="3"| 2016 || Canadian Folk Music Awards || Aboriginal Songwriters of the Year || 
|-
| Native American Music Awards || Best Folk Recording || 
|-
| Native American Music Awards || Debut Duo of the Year || 
|-
|rowspan="5"| 2017 || Canadian Folk Music Awards || Aboriginal Songwriters of the Year || 
|-
| Indigenous Music Awards || Best Folk Album || 
|-
| Canadian Folk Music Awards || Vocal Group of the Year || 
|-
| Canadian Folk Music Awards || World Group of the Year || 
|-
| Independent Music Awards || Indigenous Artist/Group of the Year || 
|-
|rowspan="11"| 2018 || Native American Music Association Awards || Best Folk Recording || 
|-
| Native American Music Association Awards || Duo of the Year || 
|-
| Native American Music Association Awards || Record of the Year || 
|-
| Native American Music Association Awards || Song of the Year || 
|-
| Native American Music Association Awards || Best Music Video || 
|-
| Native American Music Association Awards || Best Americana Recording || 
|-
| Native American Music Association Awards || Best Historical/Linguistic Performance  || 
|-
| Indigenous Music Awards || Best Folk Album || 
|-
| Indian Summer Music Awards || Folk Album of the Year || 
|-
| Indian Summer Music Awards || Best Native American Vocal || 
|-
| Indian Summer Music Awards || Pop Song of the Year || 
|-
|rowspan="2"| 2019 || Native American Music Association Awards || Best Indie Single of the Year || 
|-
| Native American Music Association Awards || Best Concept for a Music Video || 
|-
|rowspan="4"| 2021 
| Summer Solstice Indigenous Music Awards || Recording Artist of the Year || 
|-
| Summer Solstice Indigenous Music Awards || Radio Song/Single of the Year || 
|-
| Summer Solstice Indigenous Music Awards || Pop/Rock/Alternative Album of the Year || 
|-
| Summer Solstice Indigenous Music Awards || Music in the Arts || 
|-
|rowspan="7"| 2022 || Native American Music Awards || Best Group/Duo of the Year || 
|-
| Native American Music Awards || Pop Recording || 
|-
| Native American Music Awards || Best Pop Video || 
|-
| Native American Music Awards || Best Contemporary Vocal Video || 
|-
| Capital Music Awards || Group of the Year || 
|-
| Canadian Folk Music Awards || Indigenous Songwriter(s) of the Year || 
|-
| Canadian Folk Music Awards || Vocal Group of the Year ||

Family
Jaaji is the cousin of musician Beatrice Deer.

Jaaji and Chelsey are husband and wife.

References

External links

Canadian folk rock groups
First Nations musical groups
Inuit musical groups
Musical groups from Quebec
Canadian musical duos
Canadian Folk Music Award winners